Madaya is a town in the Mandalay Region of central Myanmar. It is the seat of Madaya Township. It lies along National Highway 31 (Mandalay-Myitkyina Road). Lamaing lies just to the south-east. The Madaya River in the area is connected to the Mandalay Canal, and crosses the township of Madaya diagonally for some 30 miles and joins the Irrawaddy River.

History
In the 16th century, the Gwe Shans built a stockade in the village of Okpo. On October 1, 1886 there was a reported small native garrison at Madaya and nearby Lamaing and the town was subject to invasion the same month.

References

External links
Maplandia World Gazetteer

Township capitals of Myanmar
Populated places in Pyin Oo Lwin District
Madaya Township